Total value may refer to:
Total economic value
Total philosophic value
Total value of ownership (TVO)